Yoon Joon-soo (born March 28, 1986) is a South Korean football player who played for Changwon City FC.

See also
Football in South Korea
List of football clubs in South Korea

References

External links

Yoon Joon-soo at n-league.net

1986 births
Living people
South Korean footballers
Daejeon Hana Citizen FC players
K League 1 players
Korea National League players
Sportspeople from Busan
Association football forwards